Ayer Molek is a state constituency in Malacca, Malaysia, that has been represented in the Melaka State Legislative Assembly.

Demographics

History 
According to the federal gazette issued on 31 October 2022, the Ayer Molek constituency is divided into 7 polling districts.

Representation history

Election Results

References

Malacca state constituencies